Leigh Smith may refer to:

 Leigh Smith (athlete) (born 1981), American athlete
 Leigh Smith Bodichon (1827–1891), English educationalist and feminist
 Benjamin Leigh Smith (1828–1913), British yachtsman and explorer